The 1987 Army Cadets football team was an American football team that represented the United States Military Academy in the 1987 NCAA Division I-A football season. In their fifth season under head coach Jim Young, the Cadets compiled a 5–6 record and outscored their opponents by a combined total of 277 to 223.  In the annual Army–Navy Game, the Cadets defeated Navy, 17–3.

Schedule

Personnel

Season summary

Holy Cross

at Kansas State
The Cadets rushed out to a 17-0 halftime lead by quarterback Tory Crawford who ran for 128 yards and three touchdowns in the contest.

The Citadel

Wake Forest

at Boston College

Colgate

Rutgers

Temple

at Air Force

Lafayette

vs Navy

References

Army
Army Black Knights football seasons
Army Cadets football